Alyangula is the largest township on Groote Eylandt in the Northern Territory.

History 
Groote Eylandt Mining Company (GEMCO) established Alyangula as the residence for the mining company workers in the late 1960s. The township was established under a special purpose lease between GEMCO, Anindilyakwa Land Council and the Anindilyakwa Land Trust. The township of Alyangula is an unincorporated territory within the northern region of the Northern Territory.

Climate 
Alyangula has a tropical savanna climate (Köppen: Aw, Trewartha: Awhb/Awha), with a very hot, oppressive wet season from mid-November to April and a very warm, muggy dry season from May to mid-November, typical of the Top End region of the Northern Territory.  

From May to mid-November, the prevailing winds are from the east, which due to the Great Dividing Range, cast a rain shadow throughout the Top End of the Northern Territory. Lower humidity, high winds, and lack of rain increase the likelihood of bushfires, which peak during the second half of the dry season. Typically, temperatures at day and especially night are significantly cooler than in the Summer, which increases relative comfort. The record high temperature during this season was 39.2 ºC (102.6 ºF) on 23rd of October 1987, and the record low temperature was 10.5 ºC (50.9 ºF) on 19th of July 1985.  

Starting from mid-November, northwesterly winds from the Arafura Sea draw in warm, moist ocean air, which leads to monsoonal rainfall, oppressive dew points and spectacular lightning storms. Flooding, cyclones, storms and low monsoonal troughs sometimes occur during this season. Temperatures are more stable in this season, ranging from 40.3 ºC (104.5 ºF) on 31st December 1990 to 16.0 ºC (60.8 ºF) on 15th April 1994. However, temperatures above 35 ºC (95 ºF) or below 20 ºC (68 ºF) are rare during this season.

Present day 
The township comprises a first-class resort and four clubs; an arts centre; a coffee shop; a golf course and other sporting facilities; a 25m swimming pool; a church; half a dozen shops; a bank; a post office and a travel agency. The township also has a school (Up to and including Year 11); a child care centre; a training centre; an area health centre; and a court house and police station. The town also has the cheapest fuel in Australia subsidised by the mine (August 2020 - Unleaded fuel is 102.0cpl).

References 

Groote Eylandt